Qin Hezhen (1913–1996) was a People's Republic of China politician. He was born in Jinxiang County, Shandong Province. During the Second Sino-Japanese War, he formed a guerrilla force to fight the Empire of Japan invaders. This force was later incorporated into the Eighth Route Army and was active on the border between Shandong, Jiangsu and Henan provinces. He also participated in the Chinese Civil War that followed. In 1977, Qin was made vice-governor of Shandong and became chairman of the provincial people's congress in 1983. He was a delegate to the 6th National People's Congress and the 7th National People's Congress.

References
济宁市地方史志编纂委员会. 《濟寧市志》. : 984页. .
 王增乾. 《山东革命文化人物简介》. 中共党史出版社. 2005年: 219页. .
 山东省地方史志编篡委员会. 《山东省志: 军事志》. 山东人民出版社. 1996年: 603页.
 济南市史志编纂委员会. 《济南市志》. : 221页.
 秦和珍. 山东省曲阜师范学校兖州校区. [2012-03-28].
 秦和珍. 济宁市委党史研究室. [2012-03-28].

1913 births
1996 deaths
People's Republic of China politicians from Shandong
Chinese Communist Party politicians from Shandong
Vice-governors of Shandong
Delegates to the 6th National People's Congress
Delegates to the 7th National People's Congress